Milam may refer to:
Milam, Hardy County, West Virginia, a community in Hardy County, West Virginia
Milam, Wyoming County, West Virginia, a community in Wyoming County, West Virginia